The Redline 41 is a series of sailboat designs, first built in 1967 and that remained in production in 2017. The first two designs were by Cuthbertson & Cassian and the more recent one by Mark Mills.

The three different boats that have carried the Redline 41 name are all unrelated designs.

Design and development
All the Redline 41 designs are small recreational keelboats, built predominantly of fiberglass and other composites. The earlier two designs were predominately built as cruising sailboats, whereas the most recent boat was conceived as a racer that can also be used for cruising.

The original Redline 41, later called the Mark I, was designed by Cuthbertson & Cassian and produced by Bruckmann Manufacturing, although only two were built between 1967 and the following year.

The second model, known as the Redline 41 Mark II, was also designed by Cuthbertson & Cassian and produced by Bruckmann Manufacturing starting in 1969, which became part of C&C Yachts that same year. This version was similar to the earlier version, but used new molds and 35 examples were built. The boat remained in production until 1972, when sales declined and it was discontinued. Lindsay Plastics purchased the molds and produced the Newport 41 from them under the name of Capital Yachts.

The Redline 41 name was resurrected in 2014 with a new design by Mark Mills based on his 2001 design, the King 40. It was produced by US Watercraft who bought the C&C Yachts' name, using it as a marketing brand, until the company went out of business in 2018.

Operational history
One of the two Redline 41 Mark Is produced was named Condor and won the 1972 Southern Ocean Racing Conference (SORC) championships.

Variants
Redline 41 Mark I
This model was introduced in 1967, designed by Cuthbertson & Cassian and produced by Bruckmann Manufacturing in Canada, which became part of C&C Yachts in 1969. Only two examples had been built when production ended in 1968. The design uses predominantly fibreglass construction, has a masthead sloop rig, an internally-mounted spade-type rudder and a fixed fin keel.

Redline 41 Mark II
This model was introduced in 1969 and production continued until 1972, with 35 examples constructed. It was also designed by Cuthbertson & Cassian and produced by Bruckmann Manufacturing in Canada, which was then part of C&C Yachts. The design uses predominantly fibreglass construction, has a masthead sloop rig, an internally-mounted spade-type rudder and a fixed fin keel. The boat has a PHRF racing average handicap of 108 with a high of 99 and low of 114.

C&C Yachts Redline 41
This model was introduced in 2014 and remained in production until the company went out of business in 2018. It was designed by Mark Mills and is produced by US Watercraft under the C&C Yachts brand, in Warren, Rhode Island, United States. The design uses E-glass and foam sandwich infusion construction. The mast is carbon fibre. It has a fractional sloop rig, an internally-mounted spade-type rudder and a fixed cast iron fin keel with a lead bulb weight.

See also
List of sailing boat types

References

External links
Official website archives on Archive.org

Keelboats
1960s sailboat type designs
Sailing yachts
Sailboat type designs by C&C Design
Sailboat type designs by Mark Mills
Sailboat types built by C&C Yachts